Brett Epstein (born January 5, 1978) is a musician, songwriter and record producer.
He studied at the Berklee College of Music in Boston.
Epstein is a writer on the Kimberly Caldwell (American Idol) debut album "Without Regret", co-writing "Taking Back My Life". The album was released by Capitol Records. He wrote and produced two tracks entitled "Perfect Stranger" and "Temporary Life" on the Hilary Duff film Material Girls.
Epstein has had his songs featured on PBS, specifically in a 9-11 special with the song "United States (Take A Good Look)", and he has had his songs used on the CBS show Ghost Whisperer.
Epstein also had three songs on the USA Olympic Medalist Carly Patterson's debut Album 'Back to the Beginning' distributed by Universal Republic Records. 
In 2012 Epstein worked with Korean girl group Brown Eyed Girls co-writing and co-producing their single Come With Me. It was released on July 17, 2012,
Brett played electric guitars on "Pride" off Cher's final album entitled, "Closer To The Truth" released Sept 24th 2013.

Epstein performs on all of his recordings (mainly pianos, synthesizers, guitars, and drum programming).

Discography

TV/film

Notes

Living people
Hip hop record producers
American hip hop record producers
1978 births
People from Miami Beach, Florida